Jordi Bonet i Armengol (12 May 1925 – 20 June 2022) was a Catalan architect. He was the construction director and coordinator of the Sagrada Família from 1987 to 2012.

References

1925 births
2022 deaths
20th-century Catalan architects
20th-century Spanish architects
21st-century Spanish architects
People from Barcelona
Knights Commander of the Order of St Gregory the Great